On The Bright Side is an annual Australian music festival held in Perth, Western Australia. Starting in 2010, the event is the result of collaboration between the promoters of Splendour in the Grass Festival held in Woodford, Queensland  and Rock-It held in Joondalup, Western Australia.

The event is held under the supertop at Esplanade Park in Perth  during July and in its first two years proved to be one of the highlights of the Perth winter music calendar.

In 2012, the festival was cancelled due to "conflicting artist schedules". Despite a promise to return in 2013 there was no such announcement from the festival.

Artist lineups by year

2010
 The Strokes
 Mumford & Sons
 Angus & Julia Stone
 Band Of Horses
 Hot Chip
 The Middle East
 Bluejuice
 Art vs. Science

The Ting Tings were originally announced to play in 2010 but had to pull out due to rescheduling the release of their second album. Their replacement on the bill was Art vs. Science.

2011
 The Hives
 Pulp
 Modest Mouse
 Tame Impala
 The Kills
 The Grates
 Foster the People
 James Blake
 Warpaint
 Tim & Jean

2012
The festival was cancelled in 2012 due to "conflicting artist schedules".

References

External links 
 onthebrightside.com.au

Festivals in Perth, Western Australia
Rock festivals in Australia